Jose Malgapo Taruc Jr. (September 18, 1947 – September 30, 2017), also known as Joe Taruc, was a Filipino news anchor who worked at DZRH in the Philippines. He was one of the top-rating news anchors on radio. Aside from being a news anchor, Taruc was also the Senior-Vice President of the station.

He was the news anchor of the 7am newscast DZRH Pangunahing Balita as well as Damdaming Bayan, one of the longest-running public affairs programs on the station. Taruc interviewed people about politics, mostly the president. He was also the pioneer of ABS-CBN DZAQ Radyo Patrol (predecessor of DZMM) before the Martial Law regime. Then in the 1980s, Taruc transferred to DWWW 630 of the Kanlaon Broadcasting System (now DZMM) where he teamed up with Tiya Dely Magpayo and Noli de Castro in a morning program. He also worked on DZBB Bisig Bayan 594 (later rebranded as Super Radyo) before his transfer to DZRH in 1991, which he became the station manager and newscaster.

Aside from radio, Taruc also worked in films with Phillip Salvador during the 1980s.

Taruc had 3 sons and a daughter, including former i-Witness host and documentarian, One Balita Pilipinas news anchor, and Ride Radio, TV and was heard simulcast on radio show, host Jay Taruc.

He died on September 30, 2017, 12 days after his 70th birthday on September 18, 2017.

Filmography

Film
Bayan Ko: Kapit sa Patalim (1985)
Orapronobis (1989)
Alab ng Lahi (2003)

TV/Radio
Liberty Live with Joe Taruc (GMA) (1994-1996)
Balitang Bayan Numero Uno
Todo Balita (1992-2008)
Unilab Newscast
Pangunahing Balita
Damdaming Bayan

Awards
Ka Doroy Broadcaster of the Year (16th KBP Golden Awards)

See also
DZRH
Manila Broadcasting Company

References

External links
DZRH Official Website

1947 births
2017 deaths
Filipino radio personalities
Manila Broadcasting Company people
Filipino radio journalists
People from Nueva Ecija